The 2012–13 Kansas State Wildcats men's basketball team represented Kansas State University in the 2012–13 NCAA Division I men's basketball season. The head coach was Bruce Weber, who was in his first year at the helm of the Wildcats.  The team played its home games in Bramlage Coliseum in Manhattan, Kansas, its home court since 1988.  Kansas State was a member of the Big 12 Conference. They finished the conference season with record of 14–4 to claim a share of Big 12 regular season title with Kansas. In the Big 12 tournament they beat Texas and Oklahoma State before losing to Kansas in the championship game. The season ended with a loss to La Salle in the first round of the 2013 NCAA tournament. The Wildcats finished the season with a 27–8 record.

Preseason
The team plays its home games at Bramlage Coliseum, which has a capacity of 12,528. They are in their 17th season as a member of the Big 12 Conference. Coming back from their 2011–12 season, they compiled a record of 22–11 and advanced to the Round of 32 of the 2012 NCAA Division I men's basketball tournament.

Departures

Class of 2012 Recruits

Schedule

|-
!colspan=12 style="background:#512888; color:#FFFFFF;"| Exhibition
|-

|-
!colspan=12 style="background:#512888; color:#FFFFFF;"| Non-conference Regular Season

|-
!colspan=12 style="background:#512888; color:#FFFFFF;"| Big 12 Regular Season

|-
!colspan=12 style="background:#512888; color:#FFFFFF;"| 2013 Big 12 Men's Basketball tournament

|-
!colspan=12 style="background:#512888; color:#FFFFFF;"| 2013 NCAA tournament

Rankings

Roster

See also
2012-13 NCAA Division I men's basketball season
2012–13 NCAA Division I men's basketball rankings
2013 Big 12 men's basketball tournament

References

Kansas State Wildcats men's basketball seasons
Kansas State
Kansas State
Wild
Wild